Alfred Ernest Brown  (27 August 1881 – 16 February 1962) was a British politician who served as leader of the Liberal Nationals from 1940 until 1945. He was a member of Parliament and also held many other political offices throughout the Second World War.

Biography
Born in Torquay, Devon, Brown was the son of a fisherman and prominent Baptist and it was through following his father that he came to preach, gaining much experience as a public speaker. He soon came to the attention of the local Liberals and became a prominent public speaker at political meetings.

Brown served in the First World War: in 1914 he joined the Sportsman's Battalion and in 1916 was commissioned as an officer in the Somerset Light Infantry. He was mentioned in dispatches and was awarded the Military Cross.

After three unsuccessful attempts in other constituencies, he was elected as a Liberal Member of Parliament (MP) for Rugby in the 1923 general election but lost his seat in the 1924 general election. In 1927 he returned to Parliament in a by-election at Leith. During this time he became a devoted follower of Sir John Simon as the latter became increasingly at odds with the leader of the Liberals, David Lloyd George, and the party's support, from 1929, for the minority Labour government of Ramsay MacDonald. In 1931 he followed Simon in resigning the Liberal party whip and then subsequently in setting up the Liberal Nationals.

In cabinet
In the National Government of Ramsay MacDonald, Brown became Parliamentary Secretary to the Ministry of Health in November 1931. The following year the official Liberal Cabinet ministers resigned from the government and Brown was promoted to become Secretary for Mines. In 1935 when MacDonald was succeeded as Prime Minister by Stanley Baldwin, Brown entered the Cabinet as Minister of Labour. This proved controversial as many believed that the Minister of Transport Leslie Hore-Belisha, had a stronger claim to be the next Liberal National to enter the Cabinet, though as unemployment was one of the government's biggest problems, many others felt that Brown's appointment to the job was not one to envy. He held the post for the next five years under both Baldwin and his successor, Neville Chamberlain. One of his most prominent achievements was the Unemployment Insurance (Agriculture) Act, 1936 which extended social security to nearly all workers in agriculture, forestry and horticulture. In another sphere he oversaw the formation of the National Joint Advisory Committee which assisted in wage control, compulsory arbitration, and direction of labour. He also helped workers in distributing to organise and took great pride when in 1937 the Trades Union Congress passed a unanimous resolution thanking him for this. In 1939 his department was expanded to incorporate overseeing National Service.

Party leadership
When Chamberlain fell in 1940 he was succeeded by Winston Churchill who moved Brown to the position of Secretary of State for Scotland, an unusual move as Brown, despite sitting for a Scottish constituency, was English by birth. At the same time Brown became the leader of the Liberal Nationals after Sir John Simon was transferred to the House of Lords. Brown served as Secretary of State for Scotland for a year before becoming Minister of Health for two years and finally Chancellor of the Duchy of Lancaster.

Brown's tenure as leader of the Liberal Nationals was one of decline, as the party saw its influence diminish. Many in the party had regretted the division of Liberal forces a decade earlier and Brown undertook negotiations with the Liberal Party leader Sir Archibald Sinclair over a potential reunion, but these talks foundered on the question of continued support for the National Government after the war. The change in the leadership of the Conservatives was also unfavourable and when, in 1945, Churchill formed his "Caretaker" government he did not include Brown or any other senior Liberal Nationals except Lord Rosebery  in the Cabinet, despite claiming to head a "National" administration. Brown was instead appointed Minister of Aircraft Production. In the 1945 general election Brown lost his seat.

Retirement and legacy
After the war Brown devoted his attention to the church, often visiting other parts of the Commonwealth.

Brown had a reputation for being a fast speaker and many contemporary political commentators estimated that he could deliver a statement to the House of Commons faster than any other minister. The size of his voice was also noted. Baldwin once saw Brown in a phonebox at the House of Commons and is said to have remarked, "I didn't think he needed a phone to communicate with his constituents." Another more famous story reflecting on Brown's strong voice, is told of when Stanley Baldwin was living at 11 Downing Street he was startled by a great shouting in the building. When informed that it was Ernest Brown talking to Scotland, Baldwin said "Why doesn't he use the telephone?"

References

Bibliography
 Torrance, David, The Scottish Secretaries (Birlinn 2006)

External links 
 
 Parliamentary Archives, Papers of Ernest Brown MP, 1881–1962

1881 births
1962 deaths
20th-century Baptists
Chancellors of the Duchy of Lancaster
Liberal Party (UK) MPs for English constituencies
Members of the Order of the Companions of Honour
Members of the Parliament of the United Kingdom for Edinburgh constituencies
Members of the Privy Council of the United Kingdom
Ministers in the Chamberlain peacetime government, 1937–1939
Ministers in the Chamberlain wartime government, 1939–1940
Ministers in the Churchill caretaker government, 1945
Ministers in the Churchill wartime government, 1940–1945
National Liberal Party (UK, 1931) politicians
Politicians from Torquay
Recipients of the Military Cross
Scottish Baptists
Scottish Liberal Party MPs
Secretaries of State for Scotland
Somerset Light Infantry officers
UK MPs 1923–1924
UK MPs 1924–1929
UK MPs 1929–1931
UK MPs 1931–1935
UK MPs 1935–1945
British Army personnel of World War I
Royal Fusiliers soldiers